Lineodes pulcherrima is a moth in the family Crambidae. It was described by E. Hering in 1906. It is found in Peru.

References

Moths described in 1906
Spilomelinae